The 1964 Delaware State Hornets football team represented Delaware State College—now known as Delaware State University—as a member of the Central Intercollegiate Athletic Association (CIAA) in the 1964 NCAA College Division football season. Led by coach Roy D. Moore in his fifth and final season, the Hornets compiled a 3–7 record, 3–5 in their conference.

Schedule

References

Delaware State
Delaware State Hornets football seasons
Delaware State Hornets football